Moraingy (Malagasy) or Moringue (French) is a weaponless, bare-fisted striking style of traditional martial art that originated  during the Maroseranana dynasty (1675–1896) of the Sakalava Kingdom of western coastal Madagascar. It has since become popularized throughout Madagascar, but particularly in coastal regions, and has spread to neighboring Indian Ocean islands including Réunion, Mayotte, Comoros, Seychelles and Mauritius. Participation in this form of combat was originally limited to young men, allowing elders to judge their physical fitness and strength while providing an opportunity for the youth to gain prestige and test their abilities.  Today, while the average age of participants is still between 10 and 35, young people of both genders may practice the sport. Participants are called kidabolahy (young men) or kidabo mpanao moraingy (young people who practice moraingy) and are widely respected and even feared by fellow villagers. In the North, they are called  Fagnorolahy, and the assistants, magnafo. Moraingy matches must by tradition be accompanied by music (often salegy) to induce a trance-like state in the fighters and participants, contributing to the spiritual and communal experience of the fight. As part of this experience, participants typically engage in dances during and between the matches that are meant to provoke the supporters of the opposing party, while the crowd cheers and jeers loudly.

Fighting style
A typical moraingy competition consists of a series of matches pitting two fighters, typically from different villages, against one another. Prior to the fight, all the fighters parade around in the outdoor arena (typically a soccer field) to size up and select their potential adversaries, while the spectators who ring the field cheer, sing and attempt to provoke the fighters. The matches are announced and each clan sings its own chant in support of the fighter from its village. Each match lasts only one round and ends when one of the fighters exits the arena, faints, is no longer able to defend himself, is clearly unequal to the other, or is determined to be seriously injured. The judges of the match declare a victor and no contesting of the determination is permitted; both participants are cheered by the spectators for their efforts in the match.

Moraingy is considered a half-distance or long-range fighting sport with punches predominating but with some kicks permitted. Types of punches include straight punches (mitso), hooks (mandraoky), downward slanting punches (vangofary) and a punch similar to an uppercut (vangomioriky). Defenses include guarding and sidesteps, but neither the attacks nor defenses are standardized, creating higher variability among individual fighters and between regions than in international boxing.

Spread 
Although moraingy is primarily concentrated in the coastal regions of Madagascar where it was historically popularized, Malagasy migrants took the sport with them when traveling overseas. In Reunion Island, a French territory 500 kilometers east of Madagascar, where a large number of Malagasy people were brought by the French to work as slave laborers on sugar plantations, the sport took root under the name moringue, or batay kreol.  Originally limited to the laborer's quarters of the sugar plantations, in 2005 it was recognized by the Reunion government as an official sport of the island. The popularization of the sport is in part due to a growing acknowledgement of the Malagasy and African origins of the island's Creole community.  The Reunionais form of moraingy is less violent and more inspired by the choreography and acrobatics of Brazilian capoeira than the original Malagasy form which was inspired by the Polynesian kapu kuialua. The use of jumps and stomping makes it spectacular. As in Madagascar, music is played throughout moringue matches, typically consisting of percussion or Reunionais maloya music. The government recognition of the sport was intended to foster a sense of pride and identity for the large Creole youth population of Reunion island. Moringue is now organized like other mainstream sports, with about 1000 licensees, and receives local media attention. The most celebrated Reunionais moringue athlete is Jean-Rene Dreinaza.

See also
Kapu Kuialua, a Hawaiian martial art that the Malagasy form was inspired from
Limalama

Notes

References

Malagasy culture
Combat sports
 African martial arts